Siah Darreh 3 Kuseh (also Romanized as Sīāh Darreh 3 Kūseh; also known as Sīāh Darreh 3 Kūsh and Sīāh Darreh-ye Seh) is a village in Teshkan Rural District, Chegeni District, Dowreh County, Lorestan Province, Iran. At the 2006 census, its population was 174, in 33 families.

References 

Towns and villages in Dowreh County